Plainsong or plainchant (calque from the French plain-chant) is a body of chants used in the liturgies of the Western Church. When referring to the term plainsong, it is those sacred pieces that are composed in Latin text. Plainsong was the exclusive form of Christian church music until the ninth century, and the introduction of polyphony.

The monophonic chants of plainsong have a non-metric rhythm. Their rhythms are generally freer than the metered rhythm of later Western music, and they are sung without musical accompaniment.

There are three types of chant melodies that plainsongs fall into, syllabic, neumatic, and melismatic. The free flowing melismatic melody form of plainsong is still heard in Middle Eastern music being performed today.

Although the Catholic Church (both its Eastern and Western halves) and the Eastern Orthodox churches did not split until long after the origin of plainsong, Byzantine chants are generally not classified as plainsong.

History

Plainsong developed during the earliest centuries of Christianity, influenced possibly by the music of the Jewish synagogue and certainly by the Greek modal system. It has its own system of notation.

As the number of chants in the church's repertoire increased, officials needed a better way to standardize the music. A unique form of musical notation was developed to help standardize the music and provide a reference for the performers and audience alike. The musical notations that were used were called neumes, and they are employed on a four-line staff, unlike the five-line staff we are accustomed to today. The neumes are placed above the chant's words to help the performer identify the piece's melody but did not specify the pitches or intervals that needed to be sung. Even though there were written musical manuscripts, the performers still needed to memorize the chants through oral traditions before interpreting the notation. It was not until the eleventh century that musical pitches were being integrated into written music.

Most of the earliest plainsong scripts have been destroyed due to war, purposeful destruction and natural causes such as water, fire, and poor environmental conditions. The Toledo Cathedral in Spain has one of the world's largest collections of indigenous plainsong manuscripts devoted to Western Christianity. Their collection consists of 170 volumes of plainsong chants for the procession, Mass, and Office.

There are three methods of singing psalms or other chants, responsorial, antiphonal, and solo. In responsorial singing, the soloist (or choir) sings a series of verses, each one followed by a response from the choir (or congregation). In antiphonal singing, the verses are sung alternately by soloist and choir, or by choir and congregation. It is probable that even in the early period the two methods caused the differentiation in the style of musical composition which is observed throughout the later history of plain chant, the choral compositions being of a simple kind, the solo compositions more elaborate, using a more extended compass of melodies and longer groups of notes on single syllables. The last type of plainsong performance is the solo performed by the choir or the individual performer. A marked feature in plainchant is the use of the same melody for various texts. This is quite typical for the ordinary psalmody in which the same formula, the "psalm tone", is used for all the verses of a psalm, just as in a hymn or a folk song the same melody is used for the various stanzas.

Gregorian chant is a variety of plainsong named after Pope Gregory I (6th century A.D.), although Gregory himself did not invent the chant. The tradition linking Gregory I to the development of the chant seems to rest on a possibly mistaken identification of a certain "Gregorius", probably Pope Gregory II, with his more famous predecessor. The term Gregorian Chant is often incorrectly used as a synonym of plainsong.

For several centuries, different plainchant styles existed concurrently. Standardization on Gregorian chant was not completed, even in Italy, until the 12th century. Plainchant represents the first revival of musical notation after knowledge of the ancient Greek system was lost.

In the late 9th century, plainsong began to evolve into organum, which led to the development of polyphony. When polyphony reached its climax in the sixteenth century, the use of plainsong chant was less appealing and almost completely abandoned.

There was a significant plainsong revival in the 19th century, when much work was done to restore the correct notation and performance-style of the old plainsong collections, notably by the monks of Solesmes Abbey, in northern France. After the Second Vatican Council and the introduction of the vernacular Mass, use of plainsong in the Catholic Church declined and was mostly confined to the monastic orders and to ecclesiastical societies celebrating the traditional Latin Mass (also called Tridentine Mass). But, since Pope Benedict XVI's motu proprio, Summorum Pontificum, use of the Tridentine rite has increased; this, along with other papal comments on the use of appropriate liturgical music, is promoting a new plainsong revival.

The Plainsong and Medieval Music Society was founded in 1888 to promote the performance and study of liturgical chant and medieval polyphony.

Interest in plainsong picked up in 1950s Britain, particularly in the left-wing religious and musical groups associated with Gustav Holst and the writer George B. Chambers. In the late 1980s, plainchant achieved a certain vogue as music for relaxation, and several recordings of plainchant became "classical-chart hits".

Chant types
The following is a classification of Gregorian chants into types.  Other chant traditions, such as the Ambrosian or Visigothic, may lack some of the types listed, and may have other types not listed.

Syllabic

 Scriptural reading
 Prayer
 Sequence
 Creed
 Litany
 Gloria
 Psalms
 Hymn
 Canticle
 Antiphon
 Short responsory
 Salutation
 Doxology

Neumatic

 Introit
 Tropes
 Sanctus
 Agnus Dei
 Communion

Neumatic with melismatic sections

 Kyries
 Graduals
 Alleluia
 Offertory
 Tract
 Great responsory
 Preces

Composers 
Hildegard of Bingen, a nun of the twelfth century, composed a total of 71 Latin liturgical pieces. The following is a list of her devotional pieces to the Virgin Mary.

Responsory-

 Ave Marie, o auctrix
 O clarissima mater
 O tu illustrata
 O quam preclosa

Antiphon-

 O splendidissima gemma
 Hodie (Nunc) aperuit
 Quia ergo femina
 Cum processit factura
 Cum erubuerint
 O fondens virga
 Oquam magnum miraculum
 O tu illustrata

Hymn-

 Ave generosa

Sequence-

 O virga ac diadema

Allelula-

 Alleluia, o virga mediatrix

Modes

Plainchant employs the modal system and this is used to work out the relative pitches of each line on the staff.
Read more about the use of modes in plainsong here.

Example

See also
 Anglican chant
 Gregorian chant

References

External links
Gregorian Chant - CDs, MP3 files, videos, free scores. Sacra Musica
 The book of Psalms sung in Sarum Use plainsong by Sarah James. 
 The Plainsong & Medieval Music Society

Song forms
Christian chants
Church music
Western plainchant